Halston (1932–1990) was an American fashion designer.

Halston may also refer to:
 Halston, Ontario, a community in Tyendinaga, Ontario, Canada
 Halston Hall, a historic country house in Whittington, Shropshire, England
 Halston Preceptory, a monastic house in Shropshire, England
 Halston (miniseries), a 2021 American miniseries based on the life of the fashion designer
 Halston (film), a 2019 American biographical documentary film

People with the name 
 Carissa Halston, co-founder of American literary press Aforementioned Productions
 Julie Halston, American actress and comedian
 Mike Halston, drummer for The Slugs
 Rodger Halston, American actor in Carnosaur 3: Primal Species
 Halston Sage (born 1993), American actress
 Halston family, characters in Intimate Strangers